Unuamen may refer to:
Unuamen, Nigeria, village in Edo state
Unuame, Nigeria, village in Edo state
 Story of Wenamun, ancient Egyptian text